Elections to the City of Edinburgh Council were held on 6 May 1999, the same day as the other Scottish local government elections and the Scottish Parliament general election. Turnout was 61%, an increase of 16.5% on the 1995 turnout.

References

1999
1999 Scottish local elections
1990s in Edinburgh